Jakob Häne (1913–1978) was a Swiss painter.

References
This article was initially translated from the German Wikipedia.

20th-century Swiss painters
Swiss male painters
1913 births
1978 deaths
20th-century Swiss male artists